Lauterbach is a German name originally meaning either "loud/gushing stream" or "pure/clear stream". It may refer to:


Rivers

Austria
 Lauterbach, a tributary of the Brixentaler Ache in the Brixental valley, Austria

Germany
 Lauterbach (Schiltach), a river in Baden-Württemberg, tributary of the Schiltach
 Lauterbach (Werra), a river of Thuringia, tributary of the Werra

Places

Austria
 Lauterbach, Austria, a village in Brixen im Thale in the Kitzbühel Mountains

France
 Lauterbach, a locality close to Mulhouse where Claude Louis, Comte de Saint-Germain had an estate

Germany
 Lauterbach, Baden-Württemberg, a village in the district of Rottweil
 Lauterbach, Hesse, a town in the Vogelsberg district
 Lauterbach (Marienberg), a district of the town Marienberg, Saxony
 Lauterbach (Rügen), a village in the district of Vorpommern-Rügen
 Lauterbach, Thuringia, a municipality in the Wartburgkreis district of Thuringia
 Lauterbach (Warndt), a district of Völklingen, Saarland

People
 Lauterbach (surname), a German surname

Other uses
 Lauterbach (company), a German electronic design automation company
 Lauterbach Stradivarius, an antique violin
 Lauterbach's Bowerbird, a bowerbird

See also
 Lautenbach (disambiguation)
 Laudenbach (disambiguation)